Achema is the largest fertilizer producer in the Baltic states. It is located in the city of Jonava in central Lithuania. In 2011, Achema employed about 1700 workers and reached 2.2 billion Litas revenues (about 640 million Euros), net profit was 96.3 million Litas (27.9 million Euros). The current managing director is Arūnas Laurinaitis.

As of 2022 Achema plant in Jonava is the largest natural gas consumer in Lithuania. Plant is supplied via Minsk–Kaliningrad Interconnection link to Jonava.

History 
The factory construction began in 1962 as one of the state-owned enterprises, called "Azotas". It became a member of the International Fertilizer Industry Association in 1989.

1989 environmental disaster 
On 20 March 1989 a rupture of the liquid ammonia tank occurred at the chemical fertilizer factory, causing a leakage of nearly 7,500 tonnes of ammonia. The catastrophe further developed into a fire at the storehouses of NPK 11-11-11 and other fertilizers polluting the atmosphere with products of their decomposition: nitrous oxide, chlorine gas, etc. The toxic cloud moved towards Ukmergė, Širvintos, Kėdainiai. The concentration of ammonia surpassed the permissible level 150 times in Upninkai, located 10 km from the enterprise. One day after the accident, a toxic cloud 7 km wide and 50 km long was recorded between Jonava and Kėdainiai. Seven people died during the fire and leakage of ammonia, 29 became handicapped, and more people suffered from acute respiratory and cardiac arrest.

Sistematika department 

The beginning of SC "Achema“ subdivision "Sistematika“ work is closely related to the history of SC "Achema“ when automation department was established back in 1964 at that time company "Azotas“. The department was growing together with the company, and in 1999 was reorganized into the subsidiary "Sistematika“ which activity was expanding together with the concern "Achema Group“.

Plant Closure in 2022 
The production is suspended as of September 2022 due to high costs for natural gas, which was announced to be a temporary measure in August 2022.

References

Chemical companies of Lithuania
1989 industrial disasters
Chemical companies established in 1962
1962 establishments in Lithuania
Companies based in Jonava
Chemical companies of the Soviet Union